The snowdrop is a small genus of about 20 species in the family Amaryllidaceae that are among the first bulbs to bloom in spring.

Snowdrop may also refer to:

Entertainment
 Snowdrop (game engine), developed by Massive Entertainment
 The Snow-Drop, a monthly girls' magazine  founded by Eliza Lanesford Cushing
 Snow Drop (manhwa)
 Snowdrops (novel), Booker-nominated debut novel by AD Miller
 Snowdrop (Ukrainian TV series)
 Snowdrop (South Korean TV series)
Snowdrop, for trombone, violin, and piano by Christian Wolff, 1970
"Snow Drop" (song), a song by L'Arc-en-Ciel

Ships
 MV Snowdrop, a Mersey Ferry
 USS Snowdrop (1863), a Union Navy ship
 HMS Snowdrop, the name of two ships of the Royal Navy

Other uses
 A British nickname for members of the United States Army Military Police corps, during the Second World War (referring to their white cap or helmet, white gaiters, white gloves etc.)
 The Snowdrop Campaign and Snowdrop Petition, calls for a ban on handguns in Scotland, set up in response to the Dunblane massacre

See also
 The Snowdrop Festival